DabsMyla (Dabs and Myla) are a husband-and-wife team of artists from Melbourne, Australia.

Career

They are known for their whimsical pop-art paintings and illustrations and 100% collaborative approach to their work, refusing to be individually credited.
The two moved to Los Angeles in 2009 and have shared their work in massive, public formats from the walls of Rio de Janeiro, London, Detroit, Norway and Tahiti to downtown LA.

Dabsmyla create interactive and playful installations with paintings inspired by graffiti, mid-century illustration and the Golden Age of American animation era. In 2012 they created a custom mural for Sanrio’s Hello Kitty, Hello Art! event. In 2014 they created a large-scale installation for the first-ever Hello Kitty Con at the Museum of Contemporary Art, Los Angeles. They also designed and created the elaborate set of the 2015 MTV Movie Awards as well as the event’s logo and award statuette.

In 2015, DabsMyla transformed a 4,000-square-foot Spanish revival-style building in Los Angeles into the immersive installation Before and Further in collaboration with Modernica, the American Modernism furniture brand.

They have also been commissioned by large apparel and houseware brands such as Adidas and Sanrio.

In early 2016, DabsMyla painted colorful murals covering the outside of Bob Baker’s Marionette Theater, an iconic Los Angeles institution located in historic Filipinotown.

Three blocks of DabsMyla's pop-up artwork decorated the Santa Monica Promenade with a "whimsical cast" of holiday characters and interactive installations in December 2017.

In the summer of 2018, DabsMyla's indoor floral installation, covering a wall with 3,000 paper flowers and a trio of paintings, was featured in Beyond the Streets and hailed as one of "Top 10 Must See Art Works" of the show.
Later in 2018, their "Things That Can't Be Seen" exhibition transformed the former Taschen Gallery in Beverly Grove with a mural on the outside and large-scale original paintings and installations inside. The work featured autobiographical elements and California-inspired imagery throughout. Critics said the work has "linked past and present, fiction and nonfiction" adding that "in their imaginative works, the world of DabsMyla continues to grow." Floral accents and design were provided by Birch & Bone.

Exhibitions (selected)
 Things That Can't Be Seen, Los Angeles, CA (2018)
 Beyond the Streets, Los Angeles, CA (2018)
 MTV Movie Awards, Los Angeles, CA (2015)
 Before and Further, Modernica, Vernon, CA (2015)
 Hello Kitty Convention, MOCA Geffen Contemporary, Los Angeles (2014)
 Hello Kitty, Hello Art, Openhouse Gallery, New York (2014)
 20 Years Under the Influence of Juxtapoz, Los Angeles Municipal Art Gallery at Barnsdall Park (2015)
 Cruel Summer, Jonathan LeVine Gallery, New York (2014)
 Pow! Wow!, Honolulu Museum of Art, Hawaii (2014)
 San Francisco is For Lovers - White Walls Gallery, San Francisco, CA (2013)
 All Good Things – Metro Gallery, Melbourne, Australia (2013)
 Break Night Lovers – Known Gallery, Los Angeles, CA (2012)
 Marvelous Expeditions: DABS MYLA and FRIENDS – Thinkspace Gallery, Los Angeles, CA (2012)
 Double Diamond – M Modern Gallery, Palm Springs, CA (2011)
 Young & Free – White Walls Gallery, San Francisco, CA (2011)
 The Best Of Times – Thinkspace Gallery, Los Angeles, CA (2011)

References

American contemporary artists
Australian artists
Living people
Year of birth missing (living people)